Chandika may refer to:

 Chandi, the supreme Goddess of Devi Mahatmya
 Chandika, Nepal, a village in western Nepal
 Chandika (film), a 1940 Telugu film
 Chandika (comics), a fictional character appearing in comic books published by Raj Comics